= Fikscue =

Restaurant in Alameda, California, U.S.

- Interactive map of Fikscue

Restaurant information
- Location: 1708 Park Street, Alameda, California, 94501, United States
- Coordinates: 37°46′06″N 122°14′20″W

Fikscue is a restaurant in Alameda, California. It was included in The New York Times's 2024 list of the 50 best restaurants in the United States.
